Backward Castes United Front is a political party in the Indian state of Andhra Pradesh. The party was founded in February 2004. The party president is P. Ramakrishnaiah. The party works for reservations for Backward Castes, for example for a reservations for BC-women.

In the Legislative Assembly elections in Andhra Pradesh 2004 BCUF had put up seven candidate, out of whom no one was close to getting elected. The best result was in Kodad, where the party candidate got 1,187 votes (which was 0.76%).

During the 2005 elections to local bodies BCUF contested the elections to the  Meboobnagar District Council (1 candidate, from Bhoothpur, 150 votes, 0.72%), Chittoor District Council (1 candidate, from Irala, 51 votes, 0.17%) and the Kapada Municipal Corporation (4 candidates, 83 votes).

References

External links
BCUF election result Andhra Pradesh 2004

Political parties in Andhra Pradesh
2004 establishments in Andhra Pradesh
Political parties established in 2004